Trevor Harvey (1911—1989) was an English conductor.

Biography
Trevor Harvey was born in 1911 in Freshwater, Isle of Wight.

He was a conductor, critic, and broadcaster. From 1935 to 1942 he worked as assistant chorus master at the BBC (in 1941 he conducted the BBC Singers and John Ireland performing Spring, the Sweet Spring, A Cradle Song, Variations on Cadet Rousselle, When May is in His Prime, Fain Would I Change That Note, A New Year Carol; the same Ireland dedicated The Holy Boy: A Carol of the Nativity to Harvey). From 1946 he was a free‐lance conductor. From 1951 to 1973 he was the conductor of Sir Robert Mayer children's concerts. From 1960 to 1972 he was with the British Youth Symphony Orchestra.

He shared an apartment with Peter Pears and Basil Douglas in the 1930s and is responsible for some important broadcast performances of Benjamin Britten, including The Company of Heaven (1937) and The World of the Spirit (1938), both composed under suggestion of Harvey, and the first performance in England of Diversions, Op. 21 in 1950.

He died in 1989 in London.

References

1911 births
1989 deaths
English conductors (music)
British male conductors (music)
20th-century British conductors (music)
20th-century British male musicians